Aborolobatea insidiosa is a species of marine crustacean in the Oedicerotidae family, and was first described in 2009 by Lauren E. Hughes and James K. Lowry.

It is a littoral marine species found at depths of 0 to 30 m in the shallow sandy bottoms of the Great Barrier Reef.

References

Gammaridea
Taxa named by James K. Lowry
Taxa named by Lauren E. Hughes
Crustaceans described in 2009